Acala is one of the 122 municipalities of Chiapas, in southern Mexico. The municipal seat is Acala.

As of 2010, the municipality had a total population of 28,947, up from 24,800 as of 2005.

Localities
As of 2010, the city of Acala had a population of 13,889, up from 12,686 as of 2005. Other than the city of Acala, the municipality had 258 localities, the largest of which (with 2010 populations in parentheses) were: 20 de Noviembre (4,636), classified as urban, and Nuevo Vicente Guerrero (El Chichonal) (2,088) and Unión Buenavista (1,847), classified as rural.

It covers an area of 295.6 km².

Climate

References

Municipalities of Chiapas